The Centenary of National Independence Commemorative Medal 1830-1930 was a Belgian commemorative medal established by royal decree on 20 July 1930 to commemorate the 100th anniversary of Belgian independence.

It was awarded to serving members of the Belgian Armed Forces and to veterans of the service as well as to civil servants who served honourably for twenty years or more prior to 1 January 1931 and who were thus eligible for the Civic Decoration for long service, the Military Cross or the Military Decoration.

Award description
The Centenary of National Independence Commemorative Medal was a 32mm wide by 30mm high silvered bronze octagon surmounted by a crown giving it a total height of 41mm.  Its obverse bore the left facing profiles of kings Leopold I, Leopold II and Albert I of Belgium.  The reverse bore the relief years "1830" and "1930" on two rows slightly offset from center superimposed over oak and laurel leaves.

The medal was suspended by a ring through a suspension loop from a white 38mm wide silk moiré ribbon with the national colours of Belgium as 3mm wide edge stripes (1mm black, 1mm yellow and 1mm red).

Noteworthy recipients (partial list)
The individuals listed below were awarded the Centenary of National Independence Commemorative Medal:
Aviator Lieutenant Colonel Baron Willy Coppens
Lieutenant General Alphonse Ferdinand Tromme
Lieutenant General Jean-Baptiste Piron
Lieutenant General Jules Joseph Pire
Cavalry Lieutenant General Sir Maximilien de Neve de Roden
Cavalry Lieutenant General Baron Victor van Strydonck de Burkel
Lieutenant General Georges Deffontaine
Lieutenant General Alphonse Verstraete
Lieutenant General Baron Raoul de Hennin de Boussu-Walcourt
Lieutenant General Joseph Leroy
Cavalry Lieutenant General Jules De Boeck
Lieutenant General Fernand Vanderhaeghen
Lieutenant General Robert Oor
Lieutenant General Libert Elie Thomas
Lieutenant General Léon Bievez
Cavalry Major General Baron Beaudoin de Maere d’Aertrycke
Major General Lucien Van Hoof
Major General Jean Buysse
Major General Paul Jacques
Commodore Georges Timmermans
Aviator Major General Norbert Leboutte
Police Lieutenant General Louis Joseph Leroy
Police Lieutenant General Oscar-Eugène Dethise
Cavalry Lieutenant General Baron Albert du Roy de Blicquy
Lieutenant General Sir Antonin de Selliers de Moranville
Lieutenant General Félix Wielemans
Lieutenant General Baron Émile Dossin de Saint-Georges
Lieutenant General Victor Bertrand
Lieutenant General Baron Armand de Ceuninck
Lieutenant General Aloïs Biebuyck
Cavalry Lieutenant General Baron Léon de Witte de Haelen
Cavalry Lieutenant General Vicount Victor Buffin de Chosal
Cavalry Lieutenant General Jules De Blauwe
Lieutenant General Baron Ferdinand de Posch
Cavalry Lieutenant General Count André de Jonghe d’Ardoye
Ambassador Esquire Bernard de l’Escaille de Lier
Governor Baron Raymond de Kerchove d’Exaerde
Governor Camille Count de Briey Baron de Landres
Count Edmond Carton de Wiart
Ambassador Jacques Delvaux de Fenffe
Count Hubert Pierlot
August de Schryver
Count Beaudoin de Lichtervelde

See also
 Belgian Revolution
 List of Orders, Decorations and Medals of the Kingdom of Belgium

References

Other sources
 Quinot H., 1950, Recueil illustré des décorations belges et congolaises, 4e Edition. (Hasselt)
 Cornet R., 1982, Recueil des dispositions légales et réglementaires régissant les ordres nationaux belges. 2e Ed. N.pl.,  (Brussels)
 Borné A.C., 1985, Distinctions honorifiques de la Belgique, 1830-1985 (Brussels)

External links
Bibliothèque royale de Belgique (In French)
Les Ordres Nationaux Belges (In French)

Orders, decorations, and medals of Belgium
Military awards and decorations of Belgium
Awards established in 1930
1930 establishments in Belgium